The Men's bantamweight is a competition featured at the 2011 World Taekwondo Championships, and was held at the Gyeongju Gymnasium in Gyeongju, South Korea on May 5 and May 6. Bantamweights were limited to a maximum of 63 kilograms in body mass.

Medalists

Results
Legend
DQ — Won by disqualification
P — Won by punitive declaration
W — Won by withdrawal

Finals

Top half

Section 1

Section 2

Section 3

Section 4

Bottom half

Section 5

Section 6

Section 7

Section 8

References
Draw
Draw

Men's 63